Martin Francis Ryan (October 23, 1874 – January 17, 1935) was an American labor union leader.

Born in Coldwater, West Virginia, Ryan began working on the railroad as soon as he left school, and moved to Beaumont, Texas when he was eighteen.  In 1899, he joined the Brotherhood of Railway Carmen of America, and in 1903 was elected to its executive.  In 1905, he was elected as the union's vice-grand chief carman, then in 1909 as its general president.  In 1918, Woodrow Wilson appointed him as a member of the First Labor Mission to Great Britain and France, and in 1924 he was a delegate to the congress of the Pan-American Federation of Labor.

In 1923, Ryan was elected as a vice-president of the American Federation of Labor, then in 1929 as the federation's treasurer.  From 1928, he was also treasurer of the Railway Labor Executives' Association, and in 1927 he was the founding treasurer of the Union Labor Life Insurance Company.

Ryan died in 1935, while still in office.

References

1874 births
1935 deaths
American trade union leaders
People from Doddridge County, West Virginia
Trade unionists from West Virginia